The Western Highland treefrog (Litoria iris) is a species of frog in the subfamily Pelodryadinae. It is found in New Guinea. Its natural habitats are subtropical or tropical moist lowland forests, subtropical or tropical moist montane forests, rivers, swamps, rural gardens, heavily degraded former forests, and canals and ditches.

References

External links
Sound recording of L. iris call

Litoria
Amphibians of New Guinea
Amphibians described in 1962
Taxonomy articles created by Polbot